Aspergillus funiculosus is an anamorph species of fungus in the genus Aspergillus. Aspergillus funiculosus produces the funiculolides A-D and the antibiotic funicin.

References

Further reading 

 

funiculosus
Fungi described in 1956